A pipelayer or sideboom is a type of a construction vehicle used to lay pipes.

External links
CAT pipelayers

Engineering vehicles